MS-74 (МС-74, No.74 Factory's Modernized Sniper rifle ) was a limited edition Soviet sniper rifle, made by Yevgeny Dragunov in 1949 at Izhevsk Machinebuilding Plant. The weapon was based on obr. 1891/31 sniper rifle with 7.62×54mmR cartridge. The main aim was to increase accuracy and improve the comfort. It was tested and recommended for use. It was not produced a lot and was never really used by the Red Army

Red Army

References

External links 
 Describing of MS-74
 Short review  Yevgeny Dragunov's developments

Sniper rifles of the Soviet Union
Izhevsk machine-building plant products
7.62×54mmR rifles